Club San Ignacio is a football team based in Vitoria-Gasteiz in the autonomous community of the Basque Country. Founded in 1964, the team plays in Tercera División RFEF – Group 4. Representing the district of Adurtza, the club's home ground is Adurtzabal, which has a capacity of 400 spectators.

San Ignacio was the formative club of Spain international forward Ernesto Valverde.

History
The San Ignacio Football Club is a modest but respected football club in the city of Vitoria-Gasteiz, and many place this club among the three or four most outstanding clubs in Álava – behind Deportivo Alavés, CD Laudio and Amurrio Club (although CD Vitoria and CD Aurrera de Vitoria are of similar stature).

The origin of the club traces back to a school in Adurtza, the San Ignacio Public School, from where the club was born in 1964, hence the nickname they receive from the Colegiales (Schoolboys). CF San Ignacio was promoted to the Tercera División RFEF (the then 4th tier of Spanish football) for the first time in 1997, after becoming champions of the Álava Preferential Regional (6th tier of Spanish football), but they only lasted a single season. In 2002, San Ignacio achieved promotion to the Tercera División RFEF again, but once again they weren't able to hold on for more than a season, being relegated at the end of the 2002-03 campaign.

In 2003, San Ignacio (who had previously been associated with Real Sociedad) agreed a four-year partnership with Deportivo Alavés to host their second reserve team in Tercera División. The affiliate became known as Alavés C-San Ignacio, maintaining the Alavés name but playing in San Ignacio colours and usually hosting fixtures at their home ground. When this entity was relegated in 2004–05, the Alavés link was discontinued.

San Ignacio continued operating independently and returned to the Tercera level twice (on each occasion their opponents included Deportivo Alavés B, the other reserve side of Alavés, with both teams being relegated in 2008–09). The club remains a partner club of Alavés. They were promoted again in 2017–18, with Alavés offering use of their Ibaia facilities for matches at that level due to the Federation being concerned with the condition of the playing surface at Adurtzabal. Further progression to the Segunda División B (never achieved by the club) was a possibility in 2018–19 until defeat in the playoffs.

Between 2019 and 2022, San Ignacio's squad was fully composed of Alavés players, acting mainly as a second reserve team behind Alavés B. In 2022, with Alavés C being reactivated, the link between Alavés and San Ignacio returned to a collaboration agreement.

Stadium
Until the 17-18 season, San Ignacio played on the Estadio Adurtzabal, with artificial grass. In the summer of 2018, due to the impossibility of playing the matches in Adurtzabal, Club San Ignacio went on to play their matches at the Ibaia facilities, owned by Deportivo Alavés.

Season to season

7 seasons in Tercera División
1 season in Tercera División RFEF

Notable players
 Jesús Owono
 Ernesto Valverde
 Asier Salcedo

CF San Ignacio B
For the 2011-12 season, the collegiate club launched a subsidiary in the First Regional of Álava (7th tier of Spanish football) to release the youth players who finished that stage.

Notes

References

External links
Official website
Regional Preferente

Football clubs in the Basque Country (autonomous community)
Association football clubs established in 1964
Divisiones Regionales de Fútbol clubs
1964 establishments in Spain
Sport in Vitoria-Gasteiz
Deportivo Alavés